The Devil's Hand, also known under its working titles of Where the Devil Hides, The Devil's Rapture, and The Occult, is a 2014 American horror movie that was directed by Christian E. Christiansen and written by Karl Mueller. The film was released direct-to-video on October 14, 2014, and centers upon five girls born into an Amish community that believes them to be part of a Satanic prophecy.

Plot
In a close-knit Amish community, a prophecy appears to come true when six girls are born on June 6. The prophecy states that six girls will be born on the sixth day of the six month and one of them will become the "Devil’s Hand" when she turns 18. Jacob, the father of one of the girls, prevents the community's Elder Beacon from killing them all, but one mother kills her daughter shortly after her birth before taking her own life.

The remaining girls, including Jacob's daughter Mary, live with relative ignorance of the prophecy as their eighteenth birthday approaches, but their actions are constantly monitored by the Elder Beacon and much of the community. Mary, who suffers from epilepsy, also begins experiencing terrifying visions. As tensions rise, a mysterious figure begins to murder the girls.

After all the girls but Mary are murdered, the killer is revealed to be Mary's mother Susan, who had been exiled from the community. As the prophecy stated that the remaining girls would be killed, Susan sought to ensure Mary would become the Devil's Hand, guaranteeing her survival. Upon turning 18, Mary assumes her role as Satan's minion and massacres the community's elders.

Cast
 Alycia Debnam-Carey as Mary
 Rufus Sewell as Jacob
 Thomas McDonell as Trevor
 Adelaide Kane as Ruth
 Leah Pipes as Sarah
 Ric Reitz as Sheriff Stevens
 Jennifer Carpenter as Rebekah
 Colm Meaney as Elder Beacon
 Jim McKeny as Elder Stone
 Katie Garfield as Abby
 Nicole Elliott as Hannah
 Stacy Edwards as Susan
 Robin Dale Robertson as Tobias Maker

Reception
Fangoria and The Dissolve both panned The Devil's Hand, and Fangoria wrote that although the cinematography was nice and the film had some talented actors, the film "plays more like a CW-style teen melodrama than a serious theological terror film, especially when Mary begins hanging out with Trevor (Thomas McDonell), a boy from the next town over who just happens to be the son of the local sheriff. The movie seems more devoted to their lovey-dovey subplot than to exploring its own darker sides—including developing insinuations that Elder Beacon is a perv in addition to being a zealot. Then, at the very end, it finally remembers it’s a horror film and delivers a suitably spooky conclusion; but all the blood and thunder of the last few minutes serve mostly to point up how half-hearted the previous 80 are." Dread Central was more positive in their review, stating "While The Devil’s Hand is not the most intelligent nor tightly plotted or creative thriller to come along lately, it is well-acted, very gory and has a great-guns ending zinger that’s a fitting nod to the old school."

References

External links
 
 

2014 films
2014 horror films
2010s serial killer films
American supernatural horror films
American serial killer films
Amish in films
2010s English-language films
Filicide in fiction
Murder–suicide in films
Roadside Attractions films
Films directed by Christian E. Christiansen
Films scored by Anton Sanko
2010s American films